The following lists events that happened during 1940 in New Zealand.

Population
 Estimated population as of 31 December: 1,633,600
 Increase since 31 December 1939: -8000 (−0.49%)
 Males per 100 females: 99.1

Incumbents

Regal and viceregal
Head of State – George VI
Governor-General – The Viscount Galway GCMG DSO OBE PC

Government

The 26th New Zealand Parliament continued with the Labour Party in government.

Speaker of the House – Bill Barnard (Labour Party)
Prime Minister – Michael Joseph Savage then Peter Fraser
Minister of Finance – Walter Nash
Minister of Foreign Affairs – Michael Joseph Savage then Frank Langstone
Attorney-General – Rex Mason
Chief Justice – Sir Michael Myers

Parliamentary opposition 
 Leader of the Opposition –  Adam Hamilton (National Party) until 26 November, then Sidney Holland (National).

Main centre leaders
Mayor of Auckland – Ernest Davis
Mayor of Hamilton – Harold David Caro
Mayor of Wellington – Thomas Hislop
Mayor of Christchurch – Robert M. Macfarlane
Mayor of Dunedin – Andrew Henson Allen

Events 

 25 March: John A. Lee is expelled from the governing Labour caucus following his outspoken criticism of dying leader Michael Joseph Savage
 27 March: New Zealand's first Labour Prime Minister, Michael Joseph Savage dies from cancer in Wellington.
She was carrying British gold destined for America. 
 12 July: Pan American Airways flying boat service from Hawaii to Auckland via Canton Island (not Kingman Reef) commences.
 German surface raiders operated in New Zealand waters in 1940 and 1941, sinking four ships.

Arts and literature

See 1940 in art, 1940 in literature

Music

See: 1940 in music

Radio

See: Public broadcasting in New Zealand

Film
Rewi's Last Stand (1940)
One Hundred Crowded Years

See: :Category:1940 film awards, 1940 in film, List of New Zealand feature films, Cinema of New Zealand, :Category:1940 films

Sport

Chess
 The 49th National Chess Championship was held in Wellington, and was won by J.B. Dunlop of Dunedin (his 6th and last title).

Cricket

Horse racing

Harness racing
 New Zealand Trotting Cup – Marlene
 Auckland Trotting Cup – Ned Worthy

Lawn bowls
The national outdoor lawn bowls championships are held in Wellington.
 Men's singles champion – G.A. Deare (Carlton Bowling Club)
 Men's pair champions – L.G. Donaldson, Bill Bremner (skip) (West End Bowling Club, Auckland)
 Men's fours champions – Bill Whittaker, J.W.T. Macklow, Alec Robertson, Frank Livingstone (skip) (Onehunga Bowling Club)

Soccer
 The Chatham Cup is won by Waterside who beat Mosgiel 6–2 in the final.
 Provincial league champions:
	Auckland:	Comrade
	Canterbury:	Western
	Hawke's Bay:	Napier HSOB
	Nelson:	No competition
	Otago:	Mosgiel
	South Canterbury:	No competition
	Southland:	No competition
	Taranaki:	RNZAF
	Waikato:	No competition
	Wanganui:	Technical College Old Boys
	Wellington:	Waterside

Births
 12 January: Dick Motz, cricketer (d. 2007)
 13 February:  Stan Rodger, politician (d. 2022)
 17 February: James Laurenson, actor
 23 March: Brian Hastings, cricketer
 14 April: Robin Tait, discus thrower (d. 1984)
 7 June: Felicity Riddy, author and academic
 10 June (in the USA): Augie Auer, meteorologist (d. 2007)
 23 June: Mike Shrimpton, cricketer (d. 2015)
 1 July (in Australia): Judith Binney, historian (d. 2011)
 8 July: Waka Nathan, rugby union player (d. 2021)
 15 July: Ian Athfield, architect (d. 2007)
 11 August: Glenys Page, cricketer (d. 2012)
 31 August: Maurice (John) Belgrave, public servant and chief ombudsman (d. 2007)
 3 September: Brian Lochore, rugby player (d. 2019)
 18 September
Bruce Murray cricketer
Jon Trimmer, ballet dancer.
 24 September: Don Brash, Governor of the Reserve Bank of New Zealand, politician
 6 October: Merv Wellington, politician (d. 2003)
 24 October: Martin Campbell, film and TV director
date unknown
David Baragwanath, High Court judge.
Robyn Donald, writer.
Tessa Duder, writer.
Joe Hawke, politician.
 Michael Jackson, poet, anthropologist
Maurice McTigue, politician and diplomat.

Deaths
 12 January: Taurekareka Henare, politician.
 27 March: Michael Joseph Savage, Prime Minister.
 28 May: Florence Young, missionary.
 6 June: F.O. Edgar "Cobber" Kain, first RAF ace of WWII.
 17 November: Frank Moore, political activist.
 Hannah Retter, New Zealand centenarian (born 1839)

See also
History of New Zealand
List of years in New Zealand
Military history of New Zealand
Timeline of New Zealand history
Timeline of New Zealand's links with Antarctica
Timeline of the New Zealand environment

For world events and topics in 1940 not specifically related to New Zealand see: 1940

References

External links

 
Years of the 20th century in New Zealand